Soheir Khashoggi (born 1947) is an Egyptian-born Saudi Arabian novelist.

Life
Khashoggi was born in Alexandria in 1947. Her father, Muhammad Khashoggi, was of Turkish origin, and the Saudi Royal physician for King Abdulaziz Al Saud, founder of the Kingdom of Saudi Arabia.  Her family surname, Khashoggi, means "spoon maker" (Kaşıkçı) in the Turkish language.

Her brother was the arms dealer Adnan Khashoggi. She went to the American University of Beirut. She is a fine artist who has a degree from Beirut's Interior Design Center. 

She divorced her second husband, and her first novel Mirage was published, in 1996 in nineteen languages. She lives in New York. Khashoggi has four daughters.

Works
Mirage, 1999
Nadia's Song, 2002
Mosaic, 2002

References

1947 births
Living people
Writers from Alexandria
Saudi Arabian people of Turkish descent
Soheir